Iranian Literature Olympiad is an annual multistage competition for Iranian high school students of the age of 17–18 in the field of Persian literature. It was founded in 1987.

References

External links
 Iranian Literature Olympiad 

Recurring events established in 1987
Iranian literary awards
Annual events in Iran